Egypt Standard Time (EGY) ( Tawqīt Miṣr al-qiyāsiyy) is UTC+02:00, which is equivalent to Eastern European Time, Central Africa Time, South African Standard Time and Central European Summer Time, and is co-linear with neighbouring Libya and Sudan. Egypt has previously used Eastern European Summer Time (UTC+03:00), during the summer periods from 1957 to 2010 and 2014–15.

History 

On 21 April 2011, the interim government abolished summer time. Standard time was therefore observed all year long.

On 7 May 2014, the Egyptian interim government decided to use summer time starting from 15 May 2014, the third Friday of May, with an exception for the holy month of Ramadan. This occurred just before the Egyptian presidential elections were expected to start.

On 20 April 2015, The Egyptian government decided against observing summer time following a poll that had been held in April 2015 regarding applying DST or not. The government decided to make the necessary amendment to the laws and asked the ministers to work on a study to determine the probability of applying daylight saving time in coming years or not. The ministry of electricity assured that the achieved electricity saving from applying summer time is not of any tangible effect.

On 29 April 2016, the government under Prime Minister Sherif Ismail decided to use summer time again (UTC+03:00) by 7 July. It was to begin after Ramadan and last until the end of October. However, it was cancelled on 4 July following a vote by the Egyptian Parliament on 28 June to abolish DST, and to comply with the April 2015 presidential decree to refrain from introducing DST.

Time zone changes

IANA time zone database
The IANA time zone database contains one zone for Egypt in the file zone.tab.

See also 
 Summer time in Egypt

References

External links 
 Al-Ahram: Daylight savings time in Egypt postponed to July
 Al-Ahram: Egypt's government to re-apply daylight saving time
 Almasry Alyoum: Egypt to cancel daylight saving time
 Time and Date.com: Egypt Abolishes Daylight Saving Time
 Time and Date.com: Egypt re-introduces Daylight Saving Time

Time zones
Time in Egypt
Time in Africa
Time in Asia
Egypt